Los Angeles Center Studios, located in the  Westlake District of Los Angeles, California, is a multipurpose facility in the former Unocal Center building (opened as Union Oil Center in April 1958) next to the 110 Freeway. Architect William Pereira designed what was the headquarters of Union Oil Company of California. The studio itself was opened in 1999, three years after Union Oil Company of California vacated the premises.

The complex now includes six film production sound stages and areas available as theatres or for events. It is located near W. 6th Street and Beaudry Avenue; the main gate's address is 450 South Bixel Street. Most film and TV production facilities in the Los Angeles region are located either in suburbs of the city (such as Hollywood itself) or adjacent cities like Burbank and Culver City; Los Angeles Center Studios is one of the only facilities actually located near downtown L.A.

References

External links
 
 List of titles with Los Angeles Center Studios as their location at IMDb
 

Buildings and structures in Downtown Los Angeles
Office buildings in Los Angeles
Television studios in the United States
Buildings and structures completed in 1960
1960 establishments in California
1960s architecture in the United States
William Pereira buildings
Union Oil Company of California